Take a Look Inside may refer to:

 Take a Look Inside (Bodyjar album), 1994
 Take a Look Inside (The Folk Implosion album), 1994